Put Your Head on My Shoulder is a Chinese television series starring Xing Fei, Lin Yi, and Tang Xiaotian. The drama is based on Zhao Qianqian's novel of the same name, and was airing from April 10 until May 16, 2019 on Tencent Video, releasing 2 episodes every Wednesday and Thursday evening while VIP members got a 6-episode head start. A Thai Remake of the series, starring Thitipoom Tachaapaikun (New) and Nilawan Iamchuasawad (Kaimuk), was produced under the same name in 2021.

Synopsis 
As Si Tu Mo (Xing Fei), an accounting student who wants to enter an advertising company's graduation nears, she is unsure about her future plans.  Si Tu Mo likes Fu Pei (Tang Xiaotian), her childhood friend, but is constantly disappointed by his indecisiveness and unreliability. Si Tu Mo, on the other hand, tries out all sorts of things all the time, but is unable to make her own decisions.

Her routine is suddenly shaken up when she meets a physics student, Gu Wei Yi (Lin Yi). While living at the dorm, she is forced by her mother to move into an apartment coincidentally owned by Gu Wei Yi's mother. Unbeknown to both, their mothers were classmates who thought their two children would make a good match and set them up. Before they know it, the matched couple begins to fall in love.

Cast

Main 
Xing Fei as Si Tu Mo
An accounting student who wants to enter an advertising company.
Lin Yi as Gu Wei Yi
A physics student who appears in Si Tu Mo's apartment and her love interest

Supporting cast
Tang Xiaotian as Fu Pei
Situ Mo's ex-crush and Gu Weiyi's dormmate.
 Zheng Ying Chen as Wang Shan
Zhou Jun Wei as Lin Zhicun
Jie Bing as Professor Jiang
Zhou Zi Xin as Xie Yuyin
Gao Yu Fei as Meng Lu
Zhang Hao Lun as Zhou Lei
 Zhu Kang Li as Ah Ke
 Chen Jing Jing as Hu Niu
Yi Sha as Xu Jie'er

Soundtrack

Reception

The series received positive reviews and had a score of 8.1 on Douban. Hotpot.tv ranked it the #5 most romantic drama of 2019. The drama was a success and hit in China and overseas (Thailand) where it achieved a cult following. On May 20, 2019, Lin Yi and costar Xing Fei held a grand fan meeting in Bangkok, Thailand, where a huge crowd of thousands fans gathered.

Awards and nominations

References

2019 Chinese television series debuts
2019 Chinese television series endings
Chinese romantic comedy television series
Television shows based on Chinese novels
Tencent original programming
Chinese web series
2019 web series debuts
Television series by Tencent Penguin Pictures